Abu al-Khayr Shams al-Din Muhammad ibn Muhammad ibn Muhammad ibn Ali ibn Yusuf al-Jazari (26 November 1350– 2 December 1429) was a scholar in the field of the qira'at of the Qur'an, whom al-Suyuti regarded as the "ultimate authority on these matters". His works on tajwid and qira'at are considered classics. The nisba (attributive title), Jazari, denotes an origin from Jazirat ibn 'Umar.

Biography 
Al-Jazari was born in Damascus on Friday 26 November 1350 (25 Ramadan 751 AH).

He wrote two large poems about Qira'at and tajwid. One was Durrat Al-Madiyyah, in the readings of three major reciters, added to the seven in the Shatibiyyah, making it ten. The other is Tayyibat An-Nashr, which is 1014 lines on the ten major reciters in great detail, of which he also wrote a commentary.

Al-Jazari died at the age of 79 on Friday 2 December 1429 (5 Rabi' al-awwal 833 AH) in Shiraz, Iran.

Disciples 
Ibn al-Jazari taught several students including Sidi Boushaki (1394-1453)

Selected works 
Al-Jazari compiled more than 90 works on qira'at (readings), ḥadīth (traditions), ta’rīkh (history) and other disciplines. These include:
Taḥbīr al-taysīr fī qirāʼāt al-ʻashr
Taqrīb al-Nashr fī al-qirāʼāt al-ʻashr
Al-Tamhīd fī ʻilm al-tajwīd
Ṭayyibat al-nashr fī al-qirāʼāt al-ʻashr
Munjid al-Muqriʼīn wa-murshid al-ṭālibīn
Ghāyat al-Nihāyah fī Ṭabaqāt al-Qurrāʻ Lexicon of the Holy Qur’ān’s Reciters

See also
 List of Ash'aris and Maturidis
 Ten recitations
 Seven readers

Notes 

Shafi'is
Asharis
Hadith scholars
Sunni imams
Writers of the medieval Islamic world
Quran reciters
1350 births
1429 deaths
14th-century jurists
15th-century jurists